Ridgeway is an unincorporated community located within Manchester Township, in Ocean County, New Jersey, United States.

A station of the New Jersey Southern Railroad was located in Ridgeway as early as 1876.

References

Manchester Township, New Jersey
Unincorporated communities in Ocean County, New Jersey
Unincorporated communities in New Jersey